The 2014 Sydney FC W-League season was the club's seventh participation in the W-League, since the league's formation in 2008.

Players

Squad information

Transfers in

Transfers out

Technical staff

Competitions

W-League

Fixtures

League table

Results summary

Results by round

Goal scorers

W-League Finals series

References

External links
 Official Website

Sydney FC (A-League Women) seasons
Sydney